Augustus Romaldus Wright (June 16, 1813 – March 31, 1891) was an American politician and lawyer, who served against the United States as a colonel in the Confederate States Army during the American Civil War.

Early life
Augustus Wright was born in Wrightsboro, Georgia and attended public school in Appling. Wright attended the Franklin College of Arts and Sciences, the founding college of the University of Georgia in Athens where he was a member of the Phi Kappa Literary Society. Wright studied law at the Litchfield Law School in Connecticut and was admitted to the State Bar of Georgia in 1835—becoming a practicing attorney in Crawfordville, Georgia, the same year. From 1842 until 1849, Wright served as judge of the superior court of the Cherokee circuit and from 1855 to 1857 as a judge of the superior court of Georgia.

Wright owned slaves.

Political career
In 1856, Augustus Wright was elected to the U.S. House of Representatives and served one term from 1857 to 1859. He later served as a delegate to the Georgia Secession Convention and the Confederate Secession Convention.

President Abraham Lincoln offered Wright the position of provisional governor of Georgia but Wright declined. Wright subsequently served in the First Confederate Congress. Augustus Wright organized "Wright’s Legion" of Georgia volunteers and served as a colonel in the Georgia 38th Infantry Regiment for the Confederate States Army in the Army of Northern Virginia.

After the war, Wright served as a member of the Georgia constitutional convention in 1877. He died in 1891 at his home near Rome, Georgia, and was buried in Rome's Myrtle Hill Cemetery.

References

See also
 Confederate States of America, causes of secession, "Died of states' rights"
 List of signers of the Georgia Ordinance of Secession

1813 births
1891 deaths
19th-century American politicians
American slave owners
Confederate States Army officers
Democratic Party members of the United States House of Representatives from Georgia (U.S. state)
Deputies and delegates to the Provisional Congress of the Confederate States
Georgia (U.S. state) lawyers
Georgia (U.S. state) state court judges
Members of the Confederate House of Representatives from Georgia (U.S. state)
Signers of the Confederate States Constitution
Signers of the Provisional Constitution of the Confederate States
Signers of the Georgia Ordinance of Secession
University of Georgia people
19th-century American judges
19th-century American lawyers
Litchfield Law School alumni